Johan Arvid Gunnar Syrén (16 January 1903, in Sweden – 1985), son to Frans Gustav Syrén and Ida Karolina Gustavsdotter, was a Swedish missionary. In the early 1930s Johan and his wife travelled to Natal, South Africa, as Swedish diplomats and missionaries.

Sources 

Historical journals and personal files 
Frans Gustav Syréns journals 
Ida Karolina Gustavsdotter's journals 
Historical journals and personal files 

Swedish Protestant missionaries
1903 births
1985 deaths
Swedish diplomats
Protestant missionaries in South Africa
Swedish expatriates in South Africa